Nurlutta railway station is located on the Gawler line.

History 

The station opened in 1950 and facilities consist of two 91 metre long platforms with small shelters.

Until 1976, Nurlutta was the only station on the Adelaide suburban system to have platforms either side of a level crossing. Trains are required to cross the Commercial Road level crossing before stopping at the appropriate platform, minimising the amount of time the level crossing is closed for vehicle traffic. This feature was duplicated in 1976 when a second platform at Seacliff opened. Kilburn has, and Munno Para prior to its renovation also had, the same feature.

Services by platform

References

South Australian Railways Working Timetable Book No. 265 effective 30 June 1974

External links

Railway stations in Adelaide
Railway stations in Australia opened in 1950